The 1982 Florida Gators football team represented the University of Florida during the 1982 NCAA Division I-A football season. The season was the fourth for Charley Pell as the head coach of the Florida Gators football team.  Pell's 1982 Florida Gators posted an 8–4 overall record and a Southeastern Conference (SEC) record of 3–3, tying for sixth place in the ten-team SEC.

The highlight of the season was a nationally televised September victory over Southern Cal in the Trojans' only visit to Florida Field. Gator linebacker Wilber Marshall had 14 tackles and 4 sacks in the 17–9 victory and was named national defensive player of the week on his way to All-American honors at the end of the season. On offense, the team was led by quarterback Wayne Peace, who set an NCAA record for completion percentage in a season (70.7%) running offensive coordinator Mike Shanahan's short passing attack.

Florida played six of their first seven games at home and rode their early season success into a #4 ranking in early October, which matched the highest AP poll placement in program history up to that time. However, close losses to LSU and Vanderbilt and a blow-out loss to arch rival Georgia knocked them out of the polls, and the Gators finished the season 8–4 after a loss in the 1982 Bluebonnet Bowl

Schedule

Primary source: 2015 Florida Gators Football Media Guide.

Personnel

References

Florida
Florida Gators football seasons
Florida Gators football